Meg Griffin (born December 2, 1953) is an American radio disc jockey, currently heard on the Sirius XM Satellite Radio channels The Loft, Classic Vinyl, The Beatles Channel, and Deep Tracks. 

Primarily known for classic and modern rock music genres, Griffin began her disc jockey career in 1975 alongside Howard Stern at WRNW in Briarcliff Manor, New York.   Griffin later had stints at K-Rock (WXRK), WNEW-FM and WBAI in New York City, WLIR on Long Island, and WMMR (1978 and 1980) in Philadelphia, Pennsylvania. Her on-air nickname is "Megless."

She was originally going to be a VJ on MTV when it launched on August 1, 1981. However, she decided against it at the last minute; Martha Quinn took her place.

Prior to the Sirius/XM merger in 2008, Griffin appeared on the Sirius channels Sirius Disorder and Folk Town. She also appeared on University of Massachusetts Boston station WUMB-FM in 2010–11.

She was featured in a 2015 documentary about Radio DJs called I Am What I Play, directed by Roger King.

Notes

1953 births
Living people
American radio personalities